The Machine in the Garden is a music duo featuring Roger Fracé and Summer Bowman. They have released seven full-length albums and one EP. Their music is a blend of different genres, such as synthpop, electronica, goth opera and goth rock.

History
The band's first release was the 1994 release Veils and Shadows EP. Initially a solo endeavor by Roger Fracé, the debut EP blended the dark elements of gothic rock with new wave and industrial tinges. However, folded within the songs were melodies of a more classical nature.

The band's sound evolved with the addition of musician Summer Bowman. Her voice lent an ethereal quality to the music on the band's first full-length recording in 1997, Underworld. The dark electronics of the debut EP were still there, but multi-layered with an atmospheric mood and style.

Released in 1999, One Winter's Night... merged intricate musical structures with emotional lyrics.

The band continued working in the studio after One Winter's Night... to create their next release, a full-length enhanced multimedia CD, Out of the Mists. This CD goes through the many facets of the band and explores classical, electronic, goth, and ethereal genres. In their creative exploration, the band made a video for the haunting and melodic song, "The Unaware."

Creating a mix of darkwave influences and ethereal melodies, the duo of Roger Fracé and Summer Bowman used soaring guitars, tribal rhythms and electronic sweeps to create 2002's Asphodel. Asphodel deals with the many layers of the band's vision, relating songs of love and desire, sorrow and despair.

XV was released in December 2007 to celebrate the band's 15th anniversary. In December 2010 they released the single In The Vanir as a digital only release.

Members
Roger Fracé
Summer Bowman

Discography
Veils and Shadows EP (ISOL8-002-2) Industrial Isolation, 1993
Underworld (dxm-001-cd) Deus ex Musica, 1997
One Winter's Night... (MPP999) Middle Pillar Presents, 1999
Out of the Mists (MPP994) Middle Pillar Presents, 2000
Asphodel (MPP986) Middle Pillar Presents, 2002
Shadow Puppets (MPP975) Middle Pillar Presents, 2005
XV (dxm-015-cd) Deus ex Musica, 2007
In the Vanir (dxm-004-dig) Deus ex Musica, 2010
Before and After the Storm (dxm-005-dig) Deus ex Musica, 2011

External links
The Machine in the Garden homepage
Detailed The Machine in the Garden discography at discogs.com

American gothic rock groups
American dark wave musical groups